Jim Hill High School is a public high school located in Jackson, Mississippi, United States, hosting the state's first International Baccalaureate Diploma (IB) program. It hosts Advanced Placement courses, a JROTC, and a SOAR program.

History

Jim Hill was founded in 1912 by James Hill, hence the name "Jim Hill" High School, for the establishment of a secondary institution for African Americans in the Jackson, Mississippi area. The former building was established on Lynch Street as an elementary school to educate the youth of West Jackson. The current building was constructed in the 1960s in the Washington Addition neighborhood. The school also was formerly housed in a building that operated as Blackburn Middle School where a new school was established in 2010. The International Baccalaureate Program hosted there was established in 1992. The new wing was annexed in 2001. 
Author, Richard Wright was a student.

Special programs

Jim Hill was the only high school in the state of Mississippi with the International Baccalaureate Diploma program. This school offers these classes in Geometry MYP, Biology MYP and IB, Humanities MYP and IB, Language MYP and IB, Physical Education MYP, Algebra II MYP, Math Studies IB, Theory of Knowledge IB, Psychology IB, Technology IB, Art MYP and IB, French MYP and IB, and Spanish MYP and IB.

For the program, students must complete a Personal Project in their 10th grade year and sign a contract, write Internal Assessments for World Literature, Mathematics, Humanities; create 12 art pieces to be sent off with their Developmental Workbooks; and take an exam in Language, Math, Humanities, Science, Psychology, Theory of Knowledge, and a foreign language in the IB Diploma years. If the composite score of the IB exam is high enough, then the student may qualify for the IB Diploma. Students who aren't as esteemed are granted the IB scholarship. Community Service (CAS hours) is calculated into the equation. Davis Magnet Elementary serves IB grades K-5 and Northwest Middle School serves IB grades 6-8.

The AP Program is offered at the school.

Feeder pattern
The following schools feed into Jim Hill High School:

Middle Schools
Blackburn Laboratory Middle School
Northwest Jackson Middle School (IB)
Elementary Schools
Baker Elementary School
Isable Elementary School
Obama Magnet Elementary School (IB)
Shirley Elementary School

Notable alumni
Al Coleman, former NFL defensive back (1967–1973)
Roosevelt Davis, former NFL defensive end for the New York Giants (1965–1967)

References

External links

Public high schools in Mississippi
Schools in Jackson, Mississippi